Besse Berry Cooper (née Brown; August 26, 1896 – December 4, 2012) was an American supercentenarian who was the world's oldest living person from June 21, 2011, until her death.

Early life, education and career
Cooper was born Besse Berry Brown in Sullivan County, Tennessee, on August 26, 1896, the third of eight children born to Richard Brown (1861–1932) and Angeline Berry (1866–1927). As a child, she did well in school and was an avid reader. She graduated from East Tennessee State Normal School (now East Tennessee State University) in 1916.  It was during this period she became a suffragette, and was a teacher in Tennessee before moving to Georgia in 1917. She taught in Between, Georgia, until 1929.

Later life
She married Luther Cooper in 1924, and had four children with him. Luther died aged 68 in December 1963. Following her husband's death, Cooper lived alone on their farm until 2001, when she moved into a nursing home at the age of 105. She spent her final years in Monroe, Georgia. Cooper died of respiratory failure on December 4, 2012, after contracting stomach flu.

Longevity
Cooper became Georgia's oldest resident on January 19, 2009, following the death of 113-year-old Beatrice Farve. She was thought to be the world's oldest living person after the death of Eunice Sanborn on January 31, 2011 until May 18, 2011, when Brazil's Maria Gomes Valentim was verified as older. On June 21, 2011, Maria Gomes Valentim died, and Cooper became the world's oldest living person. Cooper reportedly attributed her longevity to "minding her own business" and avoiding junk food.

At the time of her 116th birthday in August 2012, Cooper had four children, 11 grandchildren, 13 great-grandchildren and two great-great-grandchildren. In July 2012, a proposal was advanced to name a Georgia bridge in Cooper's honor; a bridge in Between, Georgia, was named Besse Brown Cooper Bridge on August 24, 2012. In October 2013, Cooper's grandson Paul Cooper founded the Besse Brown Cooper Foundation, a nonprofit organization dedicated to "providing financial, legal, medical and public relations support" for supercentenarians worldwide.

See also
Oldest people
100 oldest American people ever
List of the verified oldest people

References

External links
Besse Brown Cooper Foundation, a nonprofit support organisation for supercentenarians founded by Cooper's grandson

1896 births
2012 deaths
East Tennessee State University alumni
People from Sullivan County, Tennessee
People from Walton County, Georgia
American supercentenarians
Women supercentenarians
People from Monroe, Georgia
People from Kingsport, Tennessee